Jordan Cameron Graye (born June 15, 1987) is an American soccer player.

Career

College
Born  in Washington, D.C., Graye attended DeMatha Catholic High School, played club soccer for Reston FC, and played for the D.C. United Academy's U-14, U-15, U-16 and U-20 teams, and helped the U-14 squad win the Super Y-League National Title in 2001, qualifying for the national championships on three total occasions. He subsequently played five years of college soccer at the University of North Carolina at Chapel Hill, redshirting his second year in 2006.

During his college years Graye also played for the Cary RailHawks U23's in the USL Premier Development League.

Professional
Graye was drafted in the fourth round (55th overall) of the 2010 MLS SuperDraft by D.C. United. He made his professional debut on April 28, 2010 in a US Open Cup game against FC Dallas, and made his MLS debut a couple of days later on May 1 in a game against the New York Red Bulls.

On November 24, 2010, Graye was selected by expansion side Portland Timbers in the 2010 MLS Expansion Draft. Portland subsequently traded Graye to Houston Dynamo on December 13, 2010

On June 29, 2011, the Dynamo announced that Graye had been waived.

On March 4, 2012, Graye appeared as a trialist for Carolina RailHawks, seeing action in the second half of a preseason friendly against Vancouver Whitecaps.

On September 14, 2012 it was announced that Graye had signed with the Carolina RailHawks for the remainder of the NASL season and playoffs. Graye appeared in two regular season and one playoff game for the Railhawks.

International
Graye has also been with the U.S. National Team at the U-16 and U-17 levels. He spent 2003 at the U.S. U-17 National Team Residency Program and was a member of the U-16 side in 2002.

References

External links
 
 
 Fort Lauderdale Strikers Bio

1987 births
Living people
American soccer players
North Carolina Tar Heels men's soccer players
Cary Clarets players
D.C. United players
DeMatha Catholic High School alumni
Houston Dynamo FC players
North Carolina FC players
Fort Lauderdale Strikers players
Soccer players from Washington, D.C.
USL League Two players
Major League Soccer players
North American Soccer League players
United States men's youth international soccer players
D.C. United draft picks
Association football defenders